Długi Targ or Long Market in Gdańsk, Poland, is one of the most notable tourist attractions of the city. It is situated between the end of Ulica Długa (the Long Lane), and the Green Gate (Brama Zielona).

History
Established in about 13th century, initially as a merchant road leading to the oval market place. Soon after Teutonic takeover of Danzig (Gdańsk) by Teutonic Knights, known as the Gdańsk slaughter, the street become the city's main artery. Its official name in Latin Longa Platea was first written in 1331, German name Langgasse was introduced later and Polish Ulica Długa in 1552. Before the Partitions of Poland it was also called the Royal Route because it served as a road of solemn entrances into the city during the visitations by Polish monarchs. The latter name was popularized between 1457-1552. During the monarchs' visits to the city they were entertained in the tenement houses along the route and during the feasts of the Royal family the city council arrange fireworks here.

The street was inhabited by the most prominent and the most wealthy citizens of the Royal City of Danzig. It was also a place of executions of witches, heretics and criminals that were nobles or city's citizens. The others were executed on Galgenberg/Szubieniczna Góra (Gallows Mountain) or in Peinkammertor/Katownia (Torture chamber).

Features

See also 
 List of mannerist structures in Northern Poland

References

External links 

Buildings and structures in Gdańsk
Squares in Poland
Tourist attractions in Gdańsk